Giovanni Bossi (born 31 May 1954) is an Italian equestrian. He competed in two events at the 1976 Summer Olympics.

References

External links
 

1954 births
Living people
Italian male equestrians
Olympic equestrians of Italy
Equestrians at the 1976 Summer Olympics
Sportspeople from the Province of Varese
People from Somma Lombardo